Vilkkanundu Swapnangal is a 1980 Malayalam-language drama film, directed by Azad, written by M.T. Vasudevan Nair and produced by V. B. K Menon. The film stars Sukumaran, Srividya, Sudheer, Bahadoor and Sreenivasan. The film also features Mammootty, in his first credited role. The film explores the middle east boom that happened in Kerala in the eighties, when people started to go to the middle east in search of jobs with a higher pay. The film explores this through Rajagopal (Sukumaran) who goes to the middle east as an illegal immigrant to support his family.

Plot 
To support his family, Rajagopal goes to Dubai as an illegal immigrant. Later he meets friends who need work for their families and faces his future in Dubai.

Cast 
 Sukumaran... Rajagopal
 Sudheer... Gopi
 Mammootty... Madhavankutty
 Bahadoor... Mammukka
 Nellikode Bhaskaran... Achuthan Nair
 Sreenivasan... Abu
 Srividya... Malathy
 Jalaja... Sridevi
 shobha... Ranjan's sister
 Premji... Sridevi's Valyammavan
 Kunjandi... Malathy's Father
 Sreelatha Namboothiri... Alice
 Khadeeja
 Santha Devi

Production
Cinematographer Ramachandra Babu writes in his blog: "Since the film Devalokam stopped half way, M.T. wanted to give Muhammed Kutty one more chance in the film written by him and directed by M. Azad, Vilikkanundu Swapnangal. In a confrontation scene Muhammed Kutty proved himself as an actor with much potential against a stellar performance by Sukumaran. In the film his voice was not used but instead Sreenivasan had dubbed for him!"

Soundtrack 
The music was composed by M. B. Sreenivasan and the lyrics were written by Sreedharanunni.

References

External links 
 
 Prithviraj in Vilkkanundu Swapnangal Remake
 Prithviraj in a remake

1980s Malayalam-language films
1980 drama films
1980 films
Films with screenplays by M. T. Vasudevan Nair
Indian drama films